William Moses may refer to:

 William Moses (academic) (1623–1688), English academic and lawyer, Master of Pembroke College, Cambridge
 William Moses (businessman) (born 1962), American businessman and investor
 William A. Moses (1933–2002), American real estate developer
 William R. Moses (born 1959), American actor
 William Stainton Moses (1839–1892), English cleric and spiritualist medium
 William Moses (bishop), Indian religious leader, bishop of Coimbatore